This is a list of Kent County Cricket Club captains. Kent County Cricket Club was formed in 1842 and has played in the County Championship since its inception in 1890 and in List A cricket and Twenty20 cricket. The first match in which Kent have a named captain indicated on scorecards available occurred on 26–27 June 1856 when the county played MCC at Gravesend. South Norton captained the county on that occasion and throughout the period until 1870. The first official captain of the club was Lord Harris, an influential figure in the development of Kent and English cricket, who was appointed to the role in 1875. As of 2018 the current club captain is batsman Sam Billings who was appointed in January 2018, replacing Sam Northeast.

In total 33 men have been officially appointed as the captain of the club. Colin Cowdrey captained the side a total of 250 times in first-class cricket and held the position for 15 years, the most of any player since the establishment of the County Championship. At times there have been multiple captains during a season or joint captains appointed. William Patterson, for example, captained the side five times during the 1891 and 1892 seasons towards the end of each season, the only times he was able to play regularly for the county during those seasons. For the majority of both seasons the official club captain was Frank Marchant. Similarly, Ian Akers-Douglas was the club captain for five games in the 1936 season. Akers-Douglas only captained Kent for seven matches in total, the fewest of any of the official club captains.

Other players have captained the county in matches without being appointed the club captain. Peter Richardson has done so the most times in first-class matches, captaining Kent in 45 games, including 21 games in the 1963 season in place of official club captain Colin Cowdrey. In 2015 Sam Northeast captained the side on a number of occasions, including in all one-day matches, despite the club captain being Rob Key. Northeast captained the side after the beginning of the season even when Key was playing and succeeded him at the end of the season.

Kent won their first County Championship title in 1906, under the captaincy of Cloudesley Marsham, and have won the title on a further six occasions, including one shared title in 1977. Sides captained by Ted Dillon won the Championship three times in the period immediately before World War I. Mike Denness captained Kent to six one-day titles in the early 1970s.

Captains
Below is a list of club captains appointed by Kent County Cricket Club or players who have been the sole known captain when no other has been appointed. Captains are listed in order of appointment.

See also
List of Kent County Cricket Club players

Notes

References

External links
Kent County Cricket Club website

 
Cricket
Kent